Sholl is a surname which may refer to:

Betsy Sholl, American poet
Brad Sholl (born 1972), Australian rules footballer
Brett Sholl (born 1971), Australian rules footballer
Craig Sholl (born 1967), Australian rules footballer
Eddie Sholl (1872–1952), Australian rules footballer
Richard Sholl (1847–1919), Postmaster-General in Western Australia
Robert John Sholl (1819–1886), government and judicial official in Western Australia
Robert Frederick Sholl (1848–1909), entrepreneur and member of the Parliament of Western Australia

See also
Sholl analysis, quantitative analysis method in neuronal studies, from a 1953 paper by Dr D.A. Sholl of University College, London